This is a list of episodes for the television series The Mothers-in-Law.

Series overview

Episodes

Season 1 (1967–68)

Season 2 (1968–69)

References

External links
 
Mothers-in-Law